Storm Studios AS is a Norwegian postproduction company specializing in visual effects for feature films, television, commercials, music videos and animation. The company employs 25 people and is situated in Oslo, Norway. The company was started in 2001.

Productions
Storm Studios has produced visual effects on a number of movies and TV series, including:
Watchmen (2019)
Star Trek: Discovery (2019)
Black Panther (2018)
The Quake (2018)
The 12th Man (2017)
The Fate of the Furious (2017)
Grand Hotel (2016)
Pixels (2015)
The Shamer's Daughter (2015)
Captain Sabertooth and the Lama Rama Treasure (2014)
Ragnarok (2013)
The Half Brother (2013)
All That Matters Is Past (2012)
Kon-Tiki (2012)
Headhunters (2011)
Mennesker i Solen (2011)
King of Devil's Island (2010)
Trollhunter (2010)
Limbo (2010)
The Liverpool Goalie (2010)
Dead Snow (2009)
Max Manus (2008)
Peter & the Wolf (2006)
Free Jimmy (2006)

Notes

Visual effects companies
Mass media companies of Norway